The Co-operatives Secretariat was established within the Government of Canada in 1987 to help the federal government respond more effectively to the concerns and needs of co-operatives. The Secretariat advises the government on policies affecting co-operatives, co-ordinates the implementation of such policies, and encourages use of the co-operative model for the social and economic development of Canada's communities. The Secretariat also provides a link between the co-op sector and the many federal departments and agencies with which they interact.

The Co-operatives Secretariat, housed in Agriculture and Agri-Food Canada is dedicated to economic growth and social development of Canadian society through co-operative enterprise. The mandate of the Cooperatives Secretariat is to: 
ensure that the needs of the co-operative sector are taken into account by the federal government, especially in the development of policies and programs. 
inform the federal government's key players about the role and the potential of co-operatives in the development of Canadian society and its economy. 
foster a beneficial exchange of views among the federal, provincial and territorial governments, co-operatives, academics and other stakeholders engaged in the development of co-operatives. 
facilitate interaction between co-operatives and the federal government. 
provide governments, key economic stakeholders and the general public with information that promotes an accurate understanding of co-operatives and the co-operative model of enterprise.

The Minister of Agriculture and Agri-Food is responsible for the Cooperatives Secretariat.

External links

Agriculture and Agri-Food Canada
Federal departments and agencies of Canada
Agriculture in Canada
1987 establishments in Canada
Government agencies established in 1987